Gaius Julius Phaedrus (Phaîdros) was a 1st-century CE Roman fabulist and the first versifier of a collection of Aesop's fables into Latin. Few facts are known about him for certain and there was little mention of his work during late antiquity. It was not until the discovery of a few imperfect manuscripts during and following the Renaissance that his importance emerged, both as an author and in the transmission of the fables.

Biography
A recent statement of the few facts that past scholars have tried to deduce from autobiographical hints given by Phaedrus in his poems has summarised them as follows: 
He was born in Macedonia, probably in Pydna, about 15 BCE, came to Rome as a slave and was freed by Augustus. He probably had some teaching function between then and the time of Tiberius, under whom the first book of his poems appeared. Envious competitors interpreted the morals of some fables as being critical of the regime and he was tried by Sejanus, probably at the time of the latter’s fall. In the prologue to his third book, we find Phaedrus pleading with a certain Eutychus to intercede on his behalf. Surviving the turbulent times into old age, possibly under Caligula and Claudius, he produced two more books and died towards the middle of the first century CE.

There is, however, no evidence to support any of this and certain facts conflict with the traditional account. What Phaedrus had to say about himself might as plausibly be reinterpreted to prove that he was born in Rome and spent the whole of his life there as a free citizen.

Work
Phaedrus is now recognized as the first writer to compile entire books of fables in Latin, retelling the Aesopic tales in senarii, a loose iambic metre. The dates of composition and publication are unknown. However, Seneca the Younger, writing between 41 and 43 CE, recommended in a letter to Claudius' freedman Polybius that he turn his hand to Latinising Aesop, 'a task hitherto not attempted by Roman genius' (Ad Polybium 8.3). This suggests that nothing was known of Phaedrus' work at that date. By the mid-80s Martial was imitating him and mentions his mischievous humour (improbi jocos Phaedri). The next reference is a homage by his fellow fabulist Avianus near the start of the 5th century, who claims the five books of fables as one of his sources in the dedication of his own work.

A 9th century manuscript of the fables of Phaedrus was only discovered in France towards the end of the 16th century. This was published in 1596 by Pierre Pithou as Fabularum Aesopiarum libri quinque and was followed by two more editions before century's end. Near the beginning of the 18th century, a manuscript of the 15th-century bishop Niccolò Perotti was discovered at Parma containing sixty-four fables of Phaedrus, of which some thirty were previously unknown. These new fables were first published in 1808, and their versions were afterwards superseded by the discovery of a much better preserved manuscript of Perotti in the Vatican Library, published in 1831. Scholars realised that Phaedrus' work had also served as the basis for Mediaeval fable collections that went by the name of Romulus and at the start of the 20th century the Swedish scholar Carl Magnus Zander (1845–1923) reconstructed 30 additional fables from their prose recensions there.

What had survived of Phaedrus' five books in Pithou's manuscript was of unequal length and seemed to indicate that material has been lost. This was supported by the apology in the prologue to the first book for including talking trees, of which there are no examples in the text that survives although there was one in the Perotti appendix. In fact only 59 out of 94 in the Pithou manuscript were even animal fables.  The author's aim at the start was to follow Aesop in creating a work that "moves one to mirth and warns with wise advice". As the work progressed, however, he widened his focus and now claimed to be "refining" Aesopic material and even adding to it. In later books we find tales of Roman events well after the time of Aesop such as "Tiberius and the slave" (II.5) and "Augustus and the accused wife" (III.9), as well as the poet's personal reply to envious detractors (IV.21); there are also anecdotes in which Aesop figures from the later biographical tradition (II.3; III.3; IV.5; and items 9 and 20 in Perotti's appendix). Finally he makes a distinction between matter and manner in the epilogue to the fifth book, commenting that
I write in Esop’s style, not in his name,
And for the most part I the subject claim.
Tho' some brief portion Esop might indite,
The more I from my own invention write,
The style is ancient but the matter’s new.
 
He also claims a place in the Latin literary tradition by echoing well-known and respected writers. It is to be noticed, however, that where Phaedrus and the slightly earlier poet Horace adapted the same fable to satirical themes, they often used different versions of it. In Horace a crow (cornicula) is the subject of The Bird in Borrowed Feathers; in Phaedrus it is a jackdaw (graculus).  In the case of The Horse that Lost its Liberty, Phaedrus has it disputing with a boar and Horace with a stag. Neither do they agree in their account of The Frog and the Ox. Horace follows the story found in Greek sources; the frog's motivation is different in Phaedrus, and it is his version that Martial follows later. Moreover, in following the model of Aesop, the enfranchised slave, Phaedrus' satire is sharper and restores "the ancient function of the fable as a popular expression against the dominant classes". Another commentator points out that "the Aesopian fable has been a political creature from its earliest origins, and Phaedrus, (who was La Fontaine's model), though more openly subversive, has claims to be the first proletarian satiric poet".

Editions
The fables of Phaedrus soon began to be published as school editions, both in the original Latin and in prose translation. Since the 18th century there have also been four complete translations into English verse. The first was by Christopher Smart into octosyllabic couplets (London 1753). Brooke Boothby's  "The Esopean Fables of Phedrus" were included in his Fables and Satires (Edinburgh, 1809) and also used octosyllables but in a more condensed manner:
What Esop taught his beasts in Greek,
Phedrus in Latin made them speak:
In English, I from him translate,
And his brief manner imitate.
It was followed by the Reverend Frederick Toller's A poetical version of the fables of Phædrus (London, 1854). These were translated more diffusely into irregular verses of five metrical feet and each fable was followed by a prose commentary. The most recent translation by P. F. Widdows also includes the fables in the Perotti appendix and all are rendered into a free version of Anglo-Saxon alliterative verse.

Phaedrus versions were translated individually by a variety of other poets into different languages. A small selection in various poetic forms appeared in the Poems & Translations (London 1769) of Ashley Cowper (1701–88). There were many more poems distinctively styled in La Fontaine's Fables; others followed by Ivan Krylov in Russian; Gregory Skovoroda and Leonid Hlibov in Ukrainian; and a more complete collection by Volodymyr Lytvynov in 1986.

References

Further reading
The fables of Phædrus, with a literal English translation, London 1828
 Champlin, Edward. "Phaedrus the Fabulous". The Journal of Roman Studies 95, 2005, pp. 97–123. 
Glauthier, Patrick. “Phaedrus, Callimachus and the Recusatio to Success.” Classical Antiquity, 28.2, 2009, pp. 248–278.
Henderson, John. “Phaedrus' "Fables:" The Original Corpus.” Mnemosyne, 52.3, 1999, pp. 308–329.
Henderson, John. Telling Tales on Caesar: Roman Stories from Phaedrus. Oxford University Press, 2001.
Jennings, Victoria. "Borrowed Plumes: Phaedrus' Fables, Phaedrus' Failures." Writing Politics in Imperial Rome. Leiden/Boston: Brill, 2009.
Lefkowitz, Jeremy B. "Grand Allusions: Vergil in Phaedrus." AJPh 137.3, 2016, pp. 487–509.
Lefkowitz, Jeremy B. "Innovation and Artistry in Phaedrus' Morals." Mnemosyne 70.3, 2017, pp. 417–435.
Libby, Brigitte B. “The Intersection of Poetic and Imperial Authority in Phaedrus' Fables.” The Classical Quarterly, 60.2, 2010, pp. 545–558.
Polt, Christopher B. “Polity Across the Pond: Democracy, Republic and Empire in Phaedrus' Fables 1.2.” The Classical Journal, 110.2, 2015, pp. 161–190.

External links 

 Pithou's editio princeps (Troyes: Jean Oudot, 1596)
 

1st-century Roman poets
1st-century Latin writers
Fabulists
Silver Age Latin writers
Imperial Roman slaves and freedmen